Conor Kenny (born 25 July 1996) is an Irish rugby union player for Newcastle Falcons. He plays as a prop.

Early life
Kenny was born in London, England, but by 1998 his family had moved to Ferbane in County Offaly, where his father was from. He first began playing rugby with West Offaly Lions before moving to Buccaneers from under-16s onwards. Kenny attended Gallen CS in Ferbane, but joined Garbally College in his fifth year to further his rugby ambitions, winning the Connacht Schools Rugby Senior Cup with school in 2017 after they beat Summerhill College 13–7.

Connacht
He joined the Connacht academy ahead of the 2016–17 season and, after completing the three-year academy cycle, he progressed to the Connacht senior squad ahead of the 2019–20 season. Kenny made his senior competitive debut for Connacht as a replacement in their 20–10 away win against Welsh side Ospreys in round 5 of the 2019–20 Pro14 on 2 November 2019.

References

External links
Conor Kenny at Connacht

Conor Kenny at Pro14

Living people
1996 births
People educated at Garbally College
Irish rugby union players
Buccaneers RFC players
Connacht Rugby players
Newcastle Falcons players
Rugby union props
Rugby union players from London